Daniel Bartlett may refer to: 
Daniel Bartlett (footballer) (born 2000), English footballer
Dan Bartlett (born 1971), counselor to the President during the George W. Bush administration
 D. Brook Bartlett (1937–2000), American judge
Daniel Bartlett, namesake of the Daniel and Esther Bartlett House, a historic house in Connecticut that is listed in the National Register of Historic Places

See also
Daniel Bartlett Allyn (born 1959), U.S. Army general
Daniel Bartlett Stevens (1837–1924), American politician and member of the Wisconsin State Assembly